Reencuentro con la gloria is a 1962 Argentine film, which was actually filmed in 1957, but not released until 5 years later.

Cast
Martín Karadagián Robert, alias "Pantera"
Lilián del Río Sonia
Orestes Soriani Father Roberto
Perla Santalla Luisa
José María Pedroza Rodolfo
Héctor Armendáriz Doctor
Raúl del Valle Raul Avila
Pedro Goitía Bobby
Javier Portales Man on tribune
Menchu Quesada Bobby's woman

References

External links
 

1962 films
1960s Spanish-language films
Argentine black-and-white films
1960s Argentine films